Onsari Gharti Magar (Nepali: ओनसरी घर्तिमगर) is a Nepali communist politician and current parliamentarian. She was the first female Speaker of the Parliament of Nepal. She was elected unopposed as Speaker on October 16, 2015.

Political career 
She served as Deputy Speaker of Parliament and was Minister of Youth and Sports in the cabinet of Jhala Nath Khanal. She was elected to the Constituent Assembly (CA) from Rolpa constituency-2 in the second CA election. She was elected to the House of Representatives in 2017 under party list.

Electoral history
2013 Constituent Assembly election

Rolpa-2

Personal life
She is married to Barsha Man Pun. Barshaman Pun is formersecretary of  the  Communist Party of Nepal (Maoist-Centre).

References

Living people
Communist Party of Nepal (Maoist Centre) politicians
21st-century Nepalese women politicians
21st-century Nepalese politicians
Nepal MPs 2017–2022
Nepal Communist Party (NCP) politicians
Chairpersons of the Constituent Assembly of Nepal
Members of the 1st Nepalese Constituent Assembly
Members of the 2nd Nepalese Constituent Assembly
1977 births